David Carmona may refer to:
David Carmona (footballer, born 1984), Spanish footballer
David Carmona (footballer, born 1997), Spanish footballer